General elections were held in Costa Rica on 1 April 1917. Federico Tinoco Granados had seized power in a military coup in January and was the only candidate in the presidential election. The elections were considered to be fraudulent and although former president Rafael Yglesias Castro received 249 votes in Alajuela, they were recorded as invalid ballots. Voter turnout was reported to be 69.2% in the presidential election and 67.6% in the parliamentary election.

Tinoco enjoyed the support of the coffee and banking oligarchy that had been affected by the reforms of Alfredo González Flores, of important political figures including (at least initially) Máximo Fernández Alvarado and Otilio Ulate Blanco, and of the Army (commanded by his brother). But it also enjoyed, at first, a very important popular support and the Tinoquista regime convened a demonstration of strength that brought together some 25,000 people on 18 March 1917.

Tinoco calls for presidential elections on April 1, 1917 as well as elections for deputies for the Constituent Assembly of 1917 that would draft a new (but short-lived) Constitution.

Results

President

References

1917 elections in Central America
1917 in Costa Rica
Elections in Costa Rica
Single-candidate elections